Elgaada Dam is one of the water dams on north of Morocco. The elgaada dam is located on the eastern border of the city of fez with an axe machine, with a water vessel of 350.000 cubic metres.

References

Dams in Morocco
Fès-Meknès